The 2022 Judo Grand Slam Budapest was held at the László Papp Budapest Sports Arena in Budapest, Hungary, from 8 to 10 July 2022 as part of the IJF World Tour and during the 2024 Summer Olympics qualification period.

Event videos
The event were aired on the IJF YouTube channel.

Medal summary

Men's events

Women's events

Source Results

Medal table

Prize money
The sums written are per medalist, bringing the total prizes awarded to 154,000€.

References

External links
 

2022 IJF World Tour
2022 Judo Grand Slam
Judo
Grand Slam 2022
Judo
Judo
Judo